Robert Wuellner (25 October 1885 – 11 August 1966) was a Swiss actor, film producer and director. Wuellner acted or directed in several German silent films early in his career, such as The Golden Bullet. From 1928 onwards he concentrated on production and continued to work through the Weimar, Nazi and Post-war periods.

Selected filmography

Director
 The Golden Bullet (1921)
 Sins of Yesterday (1922)

Producer
 The Love of the Brothers Rott (1929)
 I'll Stay with You (1931)
 Alarm at Midnight (1931)
 Two Heavenly Blue Eyes (1932)
 The Page from the Dalmasse Hotel (1933)
 The Champion of Pontresina (1934)
 The Voice of Love (1934)
 All Because of the Dog (1935)
 Dangerous Crossing (1937)
 A Girl from the Chorus (1937)
 Daphne and the Diplomat (1937)
The Chief Witness (1937)
 Carousel (1937)
 The Scapegoat (1940)
 Two in a Big City (1942)
 Peter Voss, Thief of Millions (1946)
 The Appeal to Conscience (1949)

Bibliography
 Kay Weniger: Das große Personenlexikon des Films. Die Schauspieler, Regisseure, Kameraleute, Produzenten, Komponisten, Drehbuchautoren, Filmarchitekten, Ausstatter, Kostümbildner, Cutter, Tontechniker, Maskenbildner und Special Effects Designer des 20. Jahrhunderts. Vol. 8: T – Z. David Tomlinson – Theo Zwierski. Schwarzkopf und Schwarzkopf, Berlin 2001, p. 472.

References

External links

1885 births
1966 deaths
Swiss male silent film actors
Swiss film directors
Swiss film producers
People from Lucerne